Saint Margaret's Church is the parish church of Lowestoft in the English county of Suffolk. It is dedicated to St Margaret of Antioch and is notable for its large illuminated blue spire which can be seen across the town. The church is located on a hilltop on the north-western edge of the town centre and was used as a navigation landmark.

The church is within the deanery of Lothingland and archdeaconry of Norfolk. It falls within the Diocese of Norwich which extends into north Suffolk.

History
The church is medieval and a Grade I listed building with an early 14th-century tower. It was founded by the Priory of St. Bartholomew in London which was granted the manor of Lowestoft in 1230 by Henry I. The church contains a wooden panel listing the parish priests since 1308.

The church is built of flint and was substantially enlarged during the 15th century, with the aisles and nave dating from this period. It was refurbished during the Victorian period and the needle spire rebuilt in 1954, replacing the previous wooden spire which dated from 1483. It contains the only known glasswork produced by Regency artist Robert Allen, installed in 1819. The east window glass dates from 1891 and the church also contains glasswork from St Peter's church, a daughter church of St Margaret's which was demolished in 1975.

Incumbents
Vicars
1308 John Ayshle
1330 Richard De Walcote
1331 John De Garboldesham
1339 Matthew De Rollesby
1347 John Everard
1360 John De Welberham
1365 William Homfrey
1383 ………..Apostolicus
1385 William Smogget
1432 William Sekynton
1442 John Mildewell
1456 Thomas Shirecroft
1456 John Manyngham
1458 Idem
1478 Thomas Epis Dromorensis
1490 Robert Tomsen
1507 John Wheteacre
1508 Edward Lee
1510 John Bayly
1511 John Brown
1540 John Blomevyle
1555 Thomas Downing
1561 William Naysh
1574 William Bently
1603 John Gleson
1610 Robert Hawys
…… Francis Presse
1639 James Rowse
1664 Henry Yowell
1660 John Youell
1677 Jos.Hudson
1691 Edward Carleton
1698 William Whiston
1702 James Smith
1708 John Tanner
1760 John Arrow
1789 Robert Potter
1804 Richard Lockwood
1830 Francis Cunningham
RECTORS
1860 Charles Hebert
1870 William Hay Chapman
1873 George Edward Tate
1880 Thomas Augustus Nash
1889 Charles D'Aguilar Lawrence
1901 Albert Darrell Tupper-Carey
1910 Edward Lowry Henderson
1917 Evan C. Morgan
1931 Hawtrey J. Enraght
1938 Ralph Layard Whytehead
1949 Henry Herbert Redvers Barton
1957 William John Westwood
1965 Kenneth Wilkinson Riddle (who had been Curate, 1943-47)
1969 Douglas Caiger
1979 Alan Glendining
1985 Paul Allton
1994 Martin Clifford Gray
1999 John Simpson
2011 Michael Asquith
2023 Simon Stokes

Organists  
1790 - 1854 Robert Browne Snr.
1854 - 1871 Robert Browne Jnr. (Assistant organist 1871 - 1885 and organist of St. Peter's Church, Lowestoft).
1871 - 1885 Frederick Alexander Mann.
1885 - 1902 Harry Denton Flowers.
1902 - 1935 Ernest Banks.
1935 - 1969 Cyril John Mitchell.
1969 - 1977 John Alexander Farmer.
1977 - 1987 Michael Davies.
1988 - 1996 Robert McNeil-Watson.
1996 - 2010 Steven Alan Kirk.
2011 - 2019 David Bunkell.
2019 - Jonathan Stanton Williams

Interior
Within the church the octagonal font dates from the 15th century. The brass lectern is a rare pre-Reformation lectern dating from around 1500. It also contains one of only two remaining banner stave lockers, a feature which is believed to be unique to this area of Suffolk.

There are a number of memorials within the church. The north wall of the church contains a memorial to fishermen who lost their lives at sea between 1896 and 1923. After this date the memorial was moved to The Lowestoft Fisherman's and Sailor's Bethel. A war memorial chapel contains a wooden wall inscribed with the names of 711 Lowestoft men who died in the First World War.

Churchyard
The churchyard contains war graves of two service personnel of World War I, and seventeen of World War II.

References

Lowestoft
Grade I listed churches in Suffolk
Lowestoft